Tavrey Airlines, also known as Tavrey Aircompany was an airline based in Odessa, Ukraine.

Fleet 

The Tavrey Airlines fleet consisted of three Yakolev Yak-42s when it ceased operations in 2008.

4 Yakovlev Yak-42

References 

Defunct airlines of Ukraine
Airlines established in 1995